Wheelchair fencing at the 1964 Summer Paralympics consisted of seven events.

Medal summary

References 

 

1964 Summer Paralympics events
1964
Paralympics
International fencing competitions hosted by Japan